KTRA-FM (102.1 MHz) is a radio station broadcasting a country music format. Licensed to Farmington, New Mexico, United States, the station serves the Four Corners area.  The station is currently owned by iHeartMedia, Inc. and features programming from Premiere Networks.

History
The station was assigned the call letters KTRA on September 11, 1985.

References

External links

Country radio stations in the United States
TRA-FM
Radio stations established in 1985
IHeartMedia radio stations
1985 establishments in New Mexico